Hannah Kelly (born February 15, 1988) is an American politician who has served in the Missouri House of Representatives from the 141st district since 2017.  Her district is mostly rural in south central missouri a few miles east of Springfield.

References

1988 births
21st-century American politicians
21st-century American women politicians
Living people
Republican Party members of the Missouri House of Representatives
Women state legislators in Missouri